Spider flower may  refer to plant species within the genus Cleome including:

 Cleome hassleriana  

It may also refer to plant species within the genus Grevillea from Australia including:

Grevillea albiflora, also known as white spider flower 
Grevillea buxifolia, also known as grey spider flower 
Grevillea mucronulata, also known as green spider flower 
Grevillea oleoides, also known as red spider flower
Grevillea sericea, also known as pink spider flower 
Grevillea speciosa, also known as red spider flower 

Grevillea taxa by common name